The M30 106.7 mm (4.2 inch, or "Four-deuce") heavy mortar is an American rifled, muzzle-loading, high-angle-of-fire weapon used for long-range indirect fire support to infantry units.

Design

The M30 system weighs  including the complete mortar with a welded steel rotator, M24A1 base plate and M53 sight.

A point of interest in the design of this mortar is the rifled barrel. A rifled barrel requires the round to be a very tight fit to the bore in order for the rifling to engage the round and impart rotation to it. But, in a muzzle-loading mortar, the round has to be loose enough in the bore to drop in from the front. In order to have it both ways, these rounds have an expandable ring at the base, which expands into the rifling under the pressure of the firing charge that propels the round. Additionally, imparting a spin to a round causes it to drift away from the direction of fire during flight and the longer the flight (greater range to target), the farther the drift, so the computation for setting the direction for firing at a specific target has to account for this drift.

American rounds are designed to be drop-safe and bore-safe. As such, the fuzes in the rounds for this rifled mortar only armed once the round had spun a certain number of times i.e. the round was not armed until it had exited the barrel spinning, and had consequently traveled a safe distance from the gun emplacement.

Types of rounds 
HE M329A1—max range , weight 
HE M329A2—max range , weight 
WP M328A1—max range 
ILLUM M325A2—max range , 90-second burn time
ILLUM M335A2—max range , 70-second burn time

ILLUM is illumination, a parachute flare round with fixed timed detonation. Deployment height above ground is determined by gun elevation angle and propelling charge.

HE (high-explosive) and WP (white phosphorus) rounds could be fitted with various fuses before firing, including a proximity fuse set for detonation at about 30 feet above ground to maximize the affected target area and to spray shrapnel down into foxholes.

There was also a sub-caliber training device that utilized blank 20-gauge shotgun shells to propel an inert training round a few hundred meters. This training was for the gunnery skill of laying (in a sense, aiming) the guns. This device had originally been developed during WWII for the M2 mortar.

History 
The M30 entered service with the U.S. Army in 1951, replacing the previous M2 106.7 mm mortar.

Due to this heavy weight, the mortar was most often mounted in a tracked mortar carrier of the M113 family, designated as the M106 mortar carrier. This vehicle mounted mortar was crewed by five people: the track commander (mortar sergeant/gun commander), gunner, assistant gunner, ammunition bearer and vehicle driver. Ground mounting of the mortar was time consuming and strenuous as a hole had to be dug for the base plate of the mortar to rest in, sandbags had to filled and placed around the base plate to stabilize it and to protect the exposed ammunition. Also, this decreased the accuracy of the weapon as the recoil from firing caused the base plate to shift in the ground. This movement also made the crew have to "lay" the gun back on the aiming stakes more often, causing a temporary lack of fire while the weapon was repositioned and re-sighted back to its original reference point.

During the Vietnam War, both the US Marine Corps and the US Army deployed the M30 mortar. The USMC mounted the M30 mortar on the carriage of the M116 howitzer, this assembly being known as the M98 Howtar. The Saudi Arabian Army deployed the M30 in 1990-1991 during the Gulf War. The M30 was also used in Bosnia during Operation Joint Endeavor in 1996.

Users 

 
 
 
 
 
: less than 20 
 : 4 
 
 
: 620 (including 231 on vehicles) in service in the Hellenic Army 
 : 12 from Israel, in store 
 
 : 50 
 
 
 
 : 6 

 
 
 
 

 : 20 
 
: 40 in the Philippine Army and some in the Philippine Marine Corps 
: 30 (including 20 on vehicles) in service 
: ~150 in service with the Saudi Arabian Army , some used on vehicles
 
 
: 1,264 
: US Army and US National Guard

References

See also 

 List of artillery
 List of crew served weapons of the US Armed Forces
 Chemical mortar battalions of the United States Army
 Weapons of the Laotian Civil War
 Weapons of the Lebanese Civil War

External links
Chapter 6, FM 23-90: 4.2-Inch Mortar, M30

Infantry mortars
Mortars of the United States
107 mm artillery
Chemical weapon delivery systems
Military equipment introduced in the 1950s